Quixote Winery is a boutique winery in the Stags Leap District of Napa Valley, California. The winery produces organic red wine in the premium segment, and also features unusual, eclectic architecture and label design.

Production and facilities

Quixote Winery produces Petite Sirah (Quixote spells it as Petite Syrah) and Cabernet Sauvignon varietal wines, under the "Quixote" label. The wine, which retails at $60 to $100 per bottle ($25 for Rose), is bottled with screwcaps rather than corks for better quality and storage. The wines are highly rated and receive numerous awards. Food and Wine Magazine rated Quixote one of the twenty best new wineries in the world between 1999 and 2004.

The winery building, including grounds, is the only United States project built by Viennese architect Friedensreich Hundertwasser (1928–2000). Among other unusual touches, the winery is designed in a whimsical, exotic way with ceramic tiles, irregularly rounded and painted columns, and deliberately uneven floors designed for their tactile effect on occupants' feet.  There are no right angles, except in the basement.  The design style has been called phantasmagoric, psychedelic, and Dr. Seuss-like,  and also likened to "the creation of a beautifully demented child".  The winery structure is dominated by an onion dome covered in gold leaf, as well as a living roof topped with grass, bushes, and trees.

History

In 1971, Carl Doumani purchased the historic Stags' Leap Winery.  Over two decades he restored the vineyard, winery, and manor house.  In 1996, Doumani decided to create a smaller organic and sustainable winery highlighting his much adored varietal, Petite Sirah.  He formed a friendship with renowned Austrian artist and architect Friedensreich Hundertwasser, with whom he worked to design the winery, after growing impatient with his intended project architect and noticing Hundertwasser's sculptures in a calendar.  Partly due to the unusual design process and construction methods, the winery took ten years to complete.  Hundertwasser also designed some of the winery's unusual wine labels, and persuaded Doumani to produce the wine with organic grapes.  Hundertwasser and Doumani agreed on a design approach that would emphasize that structures, and the people in them, need not be on "the grid", and could instead be close to nature.

Winemaker for Quixote is under the direction of consulting winemaker and 2012 Food and Wine Magazine Winemaker of the Year Aaron Pott since 2008.  The Vineyard Manager is Michael Wolf.

Wine Spectator reported in July 2014 that Quixote Winery had been sold to a Chinese company for approximately $29 million.

References

External links

 Quixote Winery Website
  Article discussing Carl Doumani and the Quixote Winery of Stags Leap Ranch

Wineries in Napa Valley
Companies based in Napa County, California
Expressionist architecture
Visionary environments
1996 establishments in California